Michelle Jacquet DeSevren Branch (born July 2, 1983) is an American singer, songwriter, and actress. During the early 2000s, she released two top-selling albums: The Spirit Room and Hotel Paper. She won a Grammy Award for Best Pop Collaboration with Vocals with Santana for their 2002 single, "The Game of Love".

As a solo recording artist, she signed to Madonna's Maverick record label in early 2001, and released her debut album The Spirit Room later that year. The album contained the hit singles "Everywhere" and "All You Wanted" and was followed up with Hotel Paper in 2003. In 2005, she formed the country music duo the Wreckers with Jessica Harp, and produced the Grammy-nominated single "Leave the Pieces". The Wreckers disbanded in 2007 to pursue their respective solo careers. Since then, she has released extended plays in 2010 and 2011, and a third solo album, Hopeless Romantic, on April 7, 2017. Her fourth studio album, The Trouble with Fever, was released on September 16, 2022.

Early life and education

Branch was born on July 2, 1983, in Sedona, Arizona, to David and Peggy Branch. Her father is of partial Irish ancestry, and her mother is of Dutch-Indonesian ("Indo") and French descent. Her maternal grandmother was held in a Japanese internment camp during World War II. After the war she moved to Holland, where Branch's mother was born. Her mother was five years old when the family moved from the Netherlands to Arizona.

Her siblings include an older half-brother named David and a younger sister named Nicole.

Beginning to sing at the age of three, Branch enrolled in voice lessons at Northern Arizona University when she was eight, and received her first guitar for her 14th birthday. After teaching herself chords, she composed her first song "Fallen" within a week of receiving her guitar. She initially attended Sedona Red Rock High School, but finished the last two years of her high school education through home schooling so that she could focus on her music career.

Branch has a port-wine stain birthmark under her right eye.

Career

1983–2000: Broken Bracelet
To support Branch's interests, her parents helped her book local gigs in Sedona, and later financed her independent album Broken Bracelet. Her set list at these gigs included covers of songs by Sheryl Crow, Lisa Loeb, Jewel, and Fleetwood Mac.

In December 1999, she posted two of her songs on the Rolling Stone website, which caught the attention of both pop rock band Hanson and former Rolling Stone writer and Los Angeles record producer Jeff Rabhan, eventually leading to two gigs opening for Hanson in 2000.

In June 2000, Branch self-produced Broken Bracelet, a compilation of songs she wrote starting from when she was 14; the album was released on the independent record label Twin Dragon Records. Its title was inspired from a bracelet made by pop singer Jewel, given to Branch by musician Steve Poltz at a Lisa Loeb concert she attended. Poltz told Branch that "when it breaks, you'll be famous." The Broken Bracelet recordings were destroyed in the Nashville floods in May 2010.

2001–2005: The Spirit Room and Hotel Paper

In 2001, Branch signed a recording deal with Maverick Records, where she began working with John Shanks to produce her first album and major-label debut. The album, The Spirit Room, was released in August 2001, producing the hit single "Everywhere". The single was a commercial success, winning the 2002 MTV Video Music Awards Viewer's Choice Award. "Everywhere" was later followed by singles "All You Wanted" and "Goodbye to You". In August 2001, she appeared on Total Request Live after "Everywhere" reached No. 4 on the show's chart. Due to the mainstream success of those released singles, The Spirit Room was certified Double Platinum by the RIAA for selling over two million copies in the United States. Branch also sang on the song "Deeper" from Hanson's 2004 album Underneath. VH1 also released a Pop-Up Video for her song "All You Wanted". The Spirit Room has sold 3 million copies worldwide to date.

Branch met Justincase before her debut on Maverick Records, becoming friends over the Internet before meeting in Las Vegas for a music convention in 2000. Justincase was signed to Maverick Records in late 2001 with the help of Branch. A self-titled album was released on October 29, 2002, and included several collaborations with Branch, including the lead single, "Don't Cry for Us".

In 2002, Branch teamed up with Santana, alongside songwriters Gregg Alexander and Rick Nowels, to produce the song "The Game of Love", which went on to win a Grammy Award for Best Pop Collaboration with Vocals. She also earned a Grammy nomination in 2003 for Best New Artist, which was won by Norah Jones.

Branch's second major label album, Hotel Paper, was released in 2003 and debuted at No. 2 on the Billboard 200 chart and has been certified Platinum by the RIAA for selling over one million copies. However, the album was met with mixed reviews. The lead single, "Are You Happy Now?", was a chart success, earning Branch a nomination for the Grammy Award for Best Female Rock Vocal Performance, though the song lost to Pink's "Trouble". The following singles, however, "Breathe" and "'Til I Get over You", did not match the first single's success. Branching out into television, she appeared in several shows, including Buffy the Vampire Slayer (in an uncredited appearance), American Dreams, and Charmed (as herself). In June 2004, she appeared on MTV's Faking the Video alongside Nick Lachey and JC Chasez. She also appeared in the 2002 Rob Schneider film The Hot Chick as a club DJ.

2005–2007: The Wreckers

In July 2005, Branch began collaborating with her backup singer and longtime friend Jessica Harp. They were initially known as the Cass County Homewreckers" as a joke by Branch's husband, but they trimmed it down to the Wreckers. Their album attempted to combine their respective genres—pop rock and country. It was originally slated for release in June 2005 but was delayed because of reasons surrounding Branch's pregnancy. The duo's first single "Leave the Pieces" was released in February 2006, while their album Stand Still, Look Pretty was released in May.

During this period, they contributed to Santana's album All That I Am, with the song "I'm Feeling You", appearing on the American teen television drama One Tree Hill, and joined country music stars Rascal Flatts on a U.S. tour. They initially toured with Gavin DeGraw, Tyler Hilton and Bethany Joy Galeotti, which was also written into the show during the second season. The group was nominated for the 2006 CMA Awards Vocal Duo of the Year and for a Grammy Award for Best Country Performance by a Duo or Group with Vocal for the song "Leave the Pieces" in December 2006. Stand Still, Look Pretty was certified Gold by the RIAA with sales of 851,000 copies as of March 2009. The Wreckers split in 2007.

Branch sold her Calabasas, California home and moved to Nashville, Tennessee.

2008–2012: Unreleased albums

Immediately thereafter, Branch wrote an unreleased song for Mandy Moore's 2007 album Wild Hope, and also wrote "Together" for the soundtrack of The Sisterhood of the Traveling Pants 2; it was also featured as the final song ever played on the CBS TV soap opera, Guiding Light. In October 2007, she announced that she was working on a new solo album and later reported the title would be Everything Comes and Goes. In June 2008, she played several live shows in preparation for the album's release with her sister Nicole singing backing vocals.

In early 2009, she sang the song "I Lose My Heart" in a duet with Chris Isaak on his new album Mr. Lucky. A video for the first single from the album "Sooner Or Later" was released on July 28, 2009. Also in 2009, she recorded "A Case of You" (originally by Joni Mitchell) for the compilation Covered, A Revolution in Sound which commemorated Warner Bros. Records 50th anniversary. A video was made for the song "This Way" and uploaded to Branch's official YouTube account in October 2009, but it was not released as a single and did not chart. (The video was included on a limited edition DVD entitled The Video Anthology available on michellebranch.com.) Everything Comes and Goes was finally released as a six-track extended play on July 16, 2010, via Branch's website and would be available at all retailers one month later. In 2010, Branch and R&B/hip-hop producer Timbaland collaborated on a pop/R&B song entitled "Getaway" and released a video.

In December 2010, Branch announced her return to her pop/rock roots for her album, West Coast Time. In early 2011, Branch released three previously unreleased songs from Everything Comes and Goes including, "Texas In the Mirror", "Take a Chance on Me", and "Long Goodbye", the latter a duet with Dwight Yoakam. On March 22, 2011, in a video regarding updates on the third studio album uploaded via Branch's YouTube account, Branch confirmed that half the album is finished and added that "it's sounding really really good....it's all going well and it's all on time." On April 14, 2011, it was announced that Branch had finished recording the album, she also added that "only mixing/mastering left. Michelle practiced and recorded a few tracks with Tilted Head and FIVE lead singer Joshua Barton, however it is still a work in progress." On May 26, 2011, Branch hosted a live webchat with fans in which she previewed her new single "Loud Music", which was released to the iTunes Store on June 14, 2011. The song was co-written and produced by British writers Jim Irvin and Julian Emery who collaborated with Michelle on several songs on the album. In the webcast, Branch also mentioned songs on the album called "Mastermind" and "The Story Of Us" and also added that "Through The Radio" would be a hidden track on the CD. In a previous webcast, she premiered a song from the album called "Spark". During a live outdoor performance at the Warner Brothers building she performed another new song, dedicated to her then-husband Teddy Landau, "For Dear Life". In June 2011, she released the album's first single titled "Loud Music". It has charted on the Adult Pop Songs chart. On July 12, 2011, Branch performed "God Bless America" at the MLB All-Star Game, in Phoenix, Arizona. In September, a new song "Another Sun" was featured on Fox's TV series Terra Nova. On October 29, 2011, she gave a small concert to approximately 200 fans at the Egyptian Room in downtown Indianapolis, as part of the Gravedigger's Ball. On December 12, 2011, Branch released a song titled "If You Happen to Call" for free download on the official website.

In February 2012, VH1 hosted the "100 Greatest Women In Music" special and she was nominated in both the "Pop" category and the "Greatest Female Artist of All Time". On April 3, 2012, Branch performed "Leave the Pieces" with Kelly Clarkson in Los Angeles as part of Clarkson's Stronger Tour. On September 5, the singer premiered a new pop-rock track "Mastermind". In September 2012, Branch joined Chef Michael Mina as a co-host of Cook Taste Eat, an online cooking show that aims to teach viewers how to cook quality food at home.

As with her release, Everything Comes and Goes, West Coast Time has seen numerous delays for, as yet, unknown reasons. Branch has confirmed on her Twitter account that she knows as much as the fans do about this. In January 2011, Branch confirmed in an interview with Katie Krause from Hollywire.com that the album would be released later that year. On June 1, 2011, Branch announced that the album is called West Coast Time and slated for a September 2011 release date. On December 25, 2012, Branch confirmed that West Coast Time was scheduled for release in Spring 2013, but the album has not yet been released.

2013–2017: New record deal and Hopeless Romantic

For much of 2013, Branch wrote songs and moved on from the unreleased West Coast Time. On November 5, 2013, Branch announced that she had started recording a new album in London with Martin Terefe. On February 2, 2014, she confirmed on Twitter that the rest of the album would be recorded in Nashville for a pop-rock sound. In October 2014, she recorded a cover of Radiohead's "Creep" which was subsequently used in an episode of Stalker.

On July 17, 2015, Branch announced that she had signed with Verve Records. In May 2016, she appeared on Full Frontal with Samantha Bee to sing "Goodbye Ted Cruz", a reworking of her song "Goodbye to You", as a tongue-in-cheek lament to the suspension of Ted Cruz's US presidential campaign.

In December 2016, Entertainment Weekly announced Branch's new album, Hopeless Romantic, which was released on April 7, 2017. Branch announced in September 2017, that she had parted ways with Verve Records.

Branch and Patrick Carney performed a cover of the song "A Horse with No Name" for the season 4 episode of BoJack Horseman titled "The Old Sugarman Place", where the title character drives through the desert. This version also appears on the soundtrack album of the series.

2021–present: The Spirit Room 20th anniversary album and The Trouble with Fever
During a January 5, 2021, Livestream performance for Snapple, Branch confirmed that she would be re-recording her album The Spirit Room in March 2021 to celebrate its anniversary. On September 10, 2021, Branch performed the album in its entirety during a special virtual concert. An afterparty and Q&A session followed. It was released on October 15, 2021.

On July 12, 2022, Branch announced on social media that her new single titled "I'm a Man" would be released July 15, 2022. The single was included in her fourth studio album, The Trouble with Fever, which was released on September 16, 2022.<ref name="BroadwayWorld - Trouble">{{Cite web |date=July 15, 2022 |title=Michelle Branch Announces 'The Trouble with Fever |url=https://www.broadwayworld.com/bwwmusic/article/Michelle-Branch-Announces-The-Trouble-with-Fever-20220715 |access-date=July 15, 2022 |website=Broadway World |language=en}}</ref> The album art for The Trouble with Fever is a photograph taken by Branch's father-in-law, James Carney.

Musical style and influence
Branch has stated that her music has been influenced by The Beatles, Led Zeppelin, Jimi Hendrix, Aerosmith, Lisa Loeb, Joni Mitchell, Queen, Alanis Morissette, Dolores O'Riordan, Jewel, Fleetwood Mac and Cat Stevens. She also likes classical music and older country music. Branch mainly uses a Gibson Hummingbird after retiring her blue Taylor 614ce.

Personal life
Branch married her bass player Teddy Landau (b. 1964) in Mexico on May 23, 2004, and gave birth to a child in August 2005. Branch separated from Landau in 2014, and their divorce was finalized in November 2015.

In 2015, Branch met Patrick Carney of the Black Keys at a Grammy party, and the two started dating during the production of Hopeless Romantic. In 2017, Branch and her child moved into Carney's home in Nashville. Branch and Carney have a son, who was born in August 2018. The couple lived in Nashville with their children and two Irish wolfhounds. Branch and Carney were married on April 20, 2019. In December 2020, she revealed she suffered a miscarriage. In August 2021, Branch announced she was pregnant, and in February 2022, she gave birth to a daughter, her third child and her second with Carney. On August 11, 2022, Branch announced her separation from Carney after accusing him of infidelity. She was arrested on a domestic assault charge the next day, having allegedly slapped Carney. Billboard reported that the charges against Branch were dropped at the request of the state on August 24. The following month, Branch and Carney filed to suspend their divorce proceedings.

Discography

Studio albumsBroken Bracelet (2000)
 The Spirit Room (2001)
 Hotel Paper (2003)
 Hopeless Romantic (2017)
  The Trouble with Fever'' (2022)

Filmography

Awards and nominations

Grammy Awards
The Grammy Awards are awarded annually by the National Academy of Recording Arts and Sciences. Branch has won one award from four nominations.

|-
|rowspan="2"|2003
||Michelle Branch
|Best New Artist
|
|-
|"The Game of Love" (with Santana)
||Best Pop Collaboration with Vocals
|
|-
||2004
|"Are You Happy Now?"
||Best Female Rock Vocal Performance
|
|-
||2007
|"Leave the Pieces"
||Best Country Performance by a Duo or Group with Vocal
|

MTV Video Music Awards
The MTV Video Music Awards were established in 1984 by MTV to celebrate the top music videos of the year. Branch received three nominations. 

|-
|rowspan="3"|2002
|rowspan="2"|"All You Wanted"
|Best Female Video
|
|-
|Best Pop Video
|
|-
|"Everywhere"
|Viewer's Choice
|

Teen Choice Awards
The Teen Choice Awards is an annual awards show first aired in 1999 by Fox Broadcasting Company. Branch received four nominations.

|-
|rowspan="3"|2002
|Michelle Branch
|Choice Breakout Artist
|
|-
|rowspan="2"|"All You Wanted"
|Choice Love Song
|
|-
|Choice Summer Song
|
|-
|2003
|"The Game of Love"
|Choice Hook Up
|

Other awards

References

External links

 
1983 births
21st-century American actresses
21st-century American women singers
21st-century American singers
Actresses from Arizona
Actresses from Los Angeles
American child singers
American country singer-songwriters
American women country singers
American women guitarists
American women pop singers
American women rock singers
American film actresses
American multi-instrumentalists
American people of Dutch-Indonesian descent
American people of French descent
American people of Irish descent
American musicians of Indonesian descent
American pianists
American pop rock singers
American rock songwriters
American women pianists
Grammy Award winners
Guitarists from Arizona
Guitarists from Los Angeles
Indo people
Living people
Maverick Records artists
People from Sedona, Arizona
Singers from Los Angeles
The Wreckers members
Singer-songwriters from California
Singer-songwriters from Arizona